Damville is a former commune in the Eure Department in the Normandy region in northern France. On 1 January 2016, it was merged into the new commune of Mesnils-sur-Iton.

Population

History
In the Middle Ages, Damville was important for its situation on the Norman border. The fortress of Damville was built in 1035.  The castle was burned down by Henry II of England, in 1189, it was rebuilt by Richard the Lionheart.

Personalities
 Raymond Duchamp-Villon (1876–1918), sculptor
 Jacques Villon (Gaston Duchamp) (1875–1963), painter, draughtsman and engraver.
 Michel Cluizel, chocolate factory founder
 André Couteaux, French novelist

See also
Communes of the Eure department

References

Former communes of Eure